Elise von Jung-Stilling (9 September 1829 – 10 July 1904) was painter and founder of private painting school in Riga. She was also cameralist, ophthalmologist and writer, granddaughter of writer Johann Heinrich Jung.

Biography 
Eliza von Jung-Shilling was born on 9 September 1829 in Mitáva (now Jelgava) in a Baltic-German family. In 1827 her father received the Russian hereditary nobility and in 1838 officiated as senior postmaster and state councilor in Riga.
She took private lessons from the artist Julius Döring in Mitau, who himself studied at Dresden Academy of Painting, Sculpture, Engraving, and Architecture.

She worked as a schoolteacher in various educational institutions; during the summer holidays she took additional painting lessons in Dresden with A. Eberhard, Karlsbad and in Munich with A. Liezenmayer. From 1863 till 1895 she taught drawing at the Riga City Women's High School. In 1873 she founded a private school of drawing and painting, which received official status in 1879 under the name  . The school existed until her death in 1904. In 1906  on the basis of her painting school Riga City Art School was established.
Together with her sister Amalie (1828-1905) who was pianist and music teacher,  Elise von Jung-Stilling ran a hospitable home in Riga where socializing and musical activities were cultivated. Among the guests were u. a. Max Bruch, Richard Wagner and Klara Schumann.

Before 1871 Elise had in her possession the score — an autograph of the scene and aria for soprano "Non paventar, mia vita!" from Ines de Castro opera by Carl Maria von Weber, which she had probably received as a gift from Max Maria von Weber.

References

1829 births
1904 deaths
People from Jelgava
People from Courland Governorate
Baltic-German people
19th-century Latvian painters